Elections to the 185th Massachusetts Senate were held on November 2, 2004.  The Democrats picked up one former Republican seat. The 185th Massachusetts General Court began in January 2005, and consisted of 34 Democrats and 6 Republican State Senators.

The 2004 Massachusetts House election was held on the same date as the Senate election, as well as Federal and Congressional elections.

Massachusetts Senators serve two-year terms.

Results

|-
!style="background-color:#E9E9E9" align=left width=350 10em" colspan="2" rowspan="2" | Party
!style="background-color:#E9E9E9" align=center colspan="3" | Seats
!style="background-color:#E9E9E9" align=center colspan="2" | Popular Vote
|-
!style="background-color:#E9E9E9" align=right| 2002
!style="background-color:#E9E9E9" align=right| 2004
!style="background-color:#E9E9E9" align=right| +/−
!style="background-color:#E9E9E9" align=right| Vote
!style="background-color:#E9E9E9" align=right| %
|-
| 
| style="text-align: left" | Democratic Party
| 33
| 34
| +1
| 1,725,309
| 66.68%
|-
| 
| style="text-align: left" | Republican Party
| 7
| 6
| −1
| 805,215
| 31.12%
|-
| 
| style="text-align: left" | Independents
| 0
| 0
| 0
| 41,119
| 1.6%
|-
| 
| style="text-align: left" | Libertarian Party
| 0
| 0
| 0
| 5,374
| 0.2%
|-
| style="background-color: ; width: 5px" |
| style="text-align: left" | Green Party
| 0
| 0
| 0
| 2,072
| 0.1%
|-
| style="background-color: #000000; width: 5px" |
| style="text-align: left" | Others
| 0
| 0
| 0
| 8,445
| 0.3%
|-
! colspan=2 align=left | Total
| 40
| 40
| 0
| 2,587,534
| 100%
|-
|}

Complete list of Senate contests in 2004
Official results from State Election Results 2004 (PDF, 459k) on the Massachusetts Elections Division website

Primary results

Official results from State Primary Election Results 2004 (PDF, 424k) on the Massachusetts Elections Division website

Democratic Primary

Republican Primary

See also
 2005–2006 Massachusetts legislature
 List of Massachusetts General Courts

References

State Senate
Senate 2004
Massachusetts Senate
Massachusetts Senate